This is a page on the history of Missouri Valley Conference football. The Missouri Valley Conference sponsored football from 1907 through the 1985 school year. The conference voted to drop football as a sport on April 30, 1985. At the time the Conference was a mixture of NCAA division I-A programs (Tulsa and Wichita State) and NCAA division I-AA programs (Drake, Illinois State, Indiana State, Southern Illinois, and West Texas State).

History

The Missouri Valley Conference started sponsoring football in the fall of 1907. In 1951 Drake University and Bradley University left the Missouri Valley Conference as a result of the Johnny Bright incident, a racially motivated on-field attack against Drake's black star Johnny Bright by a white Oklahoma A&M player. Both schools returned to the MVC for non-football sports several years later (Bradley in 1955 and Drake in 1956), but Bradley never rejoined for football (dropping the sport in 1970), and Drake didn't rejoin in football until 1971. Washburn University competed in football from 1935 through 1940. Saint Louis University dropped football after the 1949 season.

By the late 1960s, rising costs for football meant that basketball could no longer help subsidize football programs. According to a 2017 story in The Wichita Eagle, "The MVC looked west to find football and alienated its basketball powers." The first schools brought in during this period were New Mexico State and West Texas State (now West Texas A&M), respectively joining in 1970 and 1971; the conference also established a tie-in with the now-defunct Pasadena Bowl.

The new additions almost immediately led to conflict between several established members and the conference office. Cincinnati, Louisville, and Memphis State (now Memphis) complained about travel costs, and Memphis State was bitterly opposed to a full round-robin conference schedule, wishing to play more games within its region. All three schools left the MVC within a four-year period in the 1970s—Cincinnati in 1971, Memphis State in 1973, and Louisville in 1975. At the time of Memphis State's departure, Bradley's then-athletic director publicly said, "We sort of pushed Memphis out. They didn’t want to play everybody in football and we said that they must." These were not the only departures from the conference during this period; non-football member Saint Louis left in 1974, wishing to compete with urban basketball-focused schools like itself, and North Texas State (now North Texas) went independent in 1975 due to a desire for more scheduling flexibility. The MVC attempted to reload by adding Southern Illinois (1974 for non-football sports, 1977 for football), Indiana State (1976), and Illinois State (1980 for non-football sports, 1981 for football). The two schools whose arrival led to this instability would themselves leave in the 1980s—New Mexico State left after the 1982 season, and West Texas State left after the conference's final football season of 1985.

On December 5, 2006 the Missouri Valley Conference released its All-Centennial team.

Membership timeline
This membership timeline reflects only Missouri Valley Conference football, not the Missouri Valley Conference as a whole.

Champions by year

Championships by school

References

 
Articles which contain graphical timelines